Fertile is an unincorporated community in southeastern Saskatchewan, Canada, located  west of the Manitoba border and  north of the U.S border in the rural municipality # 31.

Demographics 
Population was once as high as 50 people, but now is supported by surrounding farm families. Once had its own school (shrined), grain elevators (2), general store, skating/curling rink, United church, community hall and post office. Only the latter two survive. Families making up the current community include;  Pickard(2), Holden(2), Malin (3), Rekken, Poirier, Millions, Bouchard (2), VanderWaal, Poirier. Fall suppers and an annual event, be it a comedy act, a magician, etc., used to be held to raise money to support the community hall.

Climate

See also
List of communities in Saskatchewan

References

Unincorporated communities in Saskatchewan
Storthoaks No. 31, Saskatchewan
Division No. 1, Saskatchewan